Gia olous… O Giannis Kalatzis se tragoudia tou Toli Voskopoulou ke Nikou Lavranou (Greek: Για όλους… Ο Γιάννης Καλατζής σε τραγούδια του Τόλη Βοσκόπουλου και Νίκου Λαβράνου) is the name of a studio album by Greek singer Giannis Kalatzis. It was released in April, 1981 by Minos EMI in Greece. This album was issued in mono and stereo. The stereo version of this album was released on CD in the 1990s by Minos EMI.

Track listing 

Side One.
 "Mera - mera, mina - mina" feat. Marinella - (Tolis Voskopoulos-Varvara Tsimpouli) - 2:48 - (Greek: Μέρα - μέρα, μήνα - μήνα)
 "Zali - zali" - (Tolis Voskopoulos-Varvara Tsimpouli) - 2:01 - (Greek: Ζάλη - ζάλη)
 "Zitianaki" feat. Marinella - (Tolis Voskopoulos-Varvara Tsimpouli) - 3:29 - (Greek: Ζητιανάκι)
 "Ti na tin kanei ti zoi" - (Tolis Voskopoulos-Varvara Tsimpouli) - 3:16 - (Greek: Τι να την κάνει τη ζωή)
 "Panayia mou" feat. Marinella - (Tolis Voskopoulos-Varvara Tsimpouli) - 3:11 - (Greek: Παναγιά μου)
 "Dio feggaria" feat. Marinella - (Tolis Voskopoulos-Mimis Theiopoulos) - 3:13 - (Greek: Δυο φεγγάρια)
Side Two.
 "Ase to nazi" - (Nikos Lavranos-Varvara Tsimpouli) - 3:01 - (Greek: Άσε το νάζι)
 "To 'na spiti dipla st' allo" feat. Marinella - (Tolis Voskopoulos-Varvara Tsimpouli) - 3:00 - (Greek: Το 'να σπίτι δίπλα στ' άλλο)
 "Avrio tis to leo" feat. Marinella - (Tolis Voskopoulos-Varvara Tsimpouli) - 2:28 - (Greek: Αύριο της το λέω)
 "Na methisoume" - (Tolis Voskopoulos-Mimis Theiopoulos) - 3:46 - (Greek: Να μεθύσουμε)
 "Mia zoi" - (Tolis Voskopoulos-Varvara Tsimpouli) - 2:36 - (Greek: Μια ζωή)
 "Min argis" - (Nikos Lavranos-Varvara Tsimpouli) - 2:36 - (Greek: Μην αργείς)

Personnel 
 Giannis Kalatzis - vocals, background vocals
 Marinella - background vocals
 Ilias Benetos - producer
 Nikos Lavranos - arranger, conductor
 Gavrilis Pantzis - recording engineer
 Alinta Mavrogeni - photographer

References

1981 albums
Giannis Kalatzis albums
Greek-language albums
Minos EMI albums